The 48th Writers Guild of America Awards honored the best television, and film writers of 1995. Winners were announced in 1996.

Winners & Nominees

Film 
Winners are listed first highlighted in boldface.

Television

Documentary

Radio

Promotional Writing and Graphic Animation

Special Awards

References

External links 

 WGA.org

1995
W
1995 in American cinema
1995 in American television